Redispatch may refer to:
 System redispatch, a procedure in electric grip operations.
 Reclearance, a procedure in flight planning.